The Saturn MP Transmission were a series of  5-speed manual and 4-speed automatic transmissions that were manufactured by Saturn Corporation exclusively for the S-Series. They were designed for transverse engine applications and was deployed in vehicles that output up to 122 ft·lbf of engine torque.

Manual Transmissions

MP2
Gear ratios

Applications
 1991–2002 Saturn SC1, SL, SL1, SW, SW1

MP3
Gear ratios

Applications
 1991–2002 Saturn SC, SC2, SL2, SW2

Automatic Transmissions

MP6
Gear ratios

Applications
 1991–2002 Saturn SC1, SL1, SW1

MP7
Gear ratios

Applications
 1991–2002 Saturn SC, SC2, SL2, SW2

Sources
 

General Motors transmissions